The women's tournament in basketball at the 1988 Summer Olympics in Seoul began on 19 September and ended on 29 September.

The United States won their second gold medal (and second consecutive gold medal) after defeating Yugoslavia, 77–70, in the gold medal match.

Competition schedule

Qualification
A NOC could enter one women's team with 12 players. Automatic qualifications were granted to the host country and the winners from the previous edition. The remaining teams were decided by a tournament held in Kuala Lumpur, Malaysia where the top six teams earned a spot.

Squads

Each NOC was limited to one team per tournament. Each team had a roster of twelve players.

Group stage

Group A

Group B

Classification round

5th–8th Place

 Classification 5–8 semifinals

 Classification 7–8

 Classification 5–6

Knockout stage

Semifinals

Bronze medal game

Gold medal game

Awards

Final ranking
Rankings are determined by classification games:

References

 Official Olympic Report
 1988 Olympic Games: Tournament for Women, FIBA Archive

 
Basketball at the 1988 Summer Olympics
Basketball at the Summer Olympics – Women's tournament